Maldives has participated all 13 editions of South Asian Games governed by South Asia Olympic Council. Maldives never hosted a single South Asian Games so far. At 13th South Asian Games, Maldives claimed its first ever gold. With that achievement Maldives became the last country to win a gold medal at the South Asian Games.

Performance 
Maldives won its first medal in 1984 Kathmandu, it came in form of bronze.

For 6 South Asian Games, Maldives failed to win a single medal.

At 1991 Colombo, Maldives was runners up by getting defeated to Pakistan in Football event and won silver medal.

At 1995 Madras, 1999 Kathmandu and 2010 Dhaka, Maldives secured 1, 4 and 2 bronze medals respectively.

From 2016 South Asian Games, Maldives increased medal count significantly with 2 silver medals from athletics and 1 bronze medal from swimming.

2019 Kathmandu/Pokhara/Janakpur was a historic for Maldives. It was the best finish on medal tally with a total of 5 medals including 4 bronze medals along with the first ever gold medal clinched for the country which came from Hassan Saaid in 100m Athletics event.

Detailed Medal Table 
Note : Yellow box around the year indicates the best performance of all time.

References

External links 

Nations at the South Asian Games
South Asian Games